Campylognathus may refer to:
Campylocephalus, a genus of eurypterid once described as Campylognathus.
Campylognathoides, a genus of pterosaur originally described as Campylognathus.
Campylognathus, synonym of the genus of plant bug Maurodactylus.